The 1878 Oregon gubernatorial election took place on June 3, 1878 to elect the governor of the U.S. state of Oregon. The election matched Republican Cornelius C. Beekman against Democrat William Wallace Thayer, with Thayer defeating Beekman by a very small margin.

Results

References

Gubernatorial
1878
Oregon
June 1878 events